Priscilla Maaswinkel (born January 14, 1985 in Utrecht) is a Dutch ten-pin bowler. She finished in 22nd position of the combined rankings at the 2006 AMF World Cup.

Notes

1985 births
Living people
Dutch ten-pin bowling players
Sportspeople from Utrecht (city)
20th-century Dutch women
21st-century Dutch women